Santa Agata a Casale is a Roman Catholic church in a rural spot outside of Rubiera, province of Reggio Emilia, region of Emilia Romagna, Italy.

History
A church at this site was documented in a papal bull of 1146, which mentions a chapel of Sant'Agata in the parish of Santi Faustino e Giovita, Rubiera. The church was dilapidated in a description of 1593, and rebuilt decades thereafter.

References

Churches in the province of Reggio Emilia
17th-century Roman Catholic church buildings in Italy